In numerical analysis, an incomplete Cholesky factorization of a symmetric positive definite matrix is a sparse approximation of the Cholesky factorization. An incomplete Cholesky factorization is often used as a preconditioner for algorithms like the conjugate gradient method.

The Cholesky factorization of a positive definite matrix A is A = LL* where L is a lower triangular matrix. An incomplete Cholesky factorization is given by a sparse lower triangular matrix K that is in some sense close to L. The corresponding preconditioner is KK*. 

One popular way to find such a matrix K is to use the algorithm for finding the exact Cholesky decomposition in which K has the same sparsity pattern as A (any entry of K is set to zero if the corresponding entry in A is also zero). This gives an incomplete Cholesky factorization which is as sparse as the matrix A.

Algorithm 

Implementation 

Implementation of the incomplete Cholesky factorization in the Octave scripting language. The factorization is stored as a lower triangular matrix, with the elements in the upper triangle set to zero.

function a = ichol(a)
	n = size(a,1);

	for k=1:n
		a(k,k) = sqrt(a(k,k));
		for i=(k+1):n
		    if (a(i,k)!=0)
		        a(i,k) = a(i,k)/a(k,k);            
		    endif
		endfor
		for j=(k+1):n
		    for i=j:n
		        if (a(i,j)!=0)
		            a(i,j) = a(i,j)-a(i,k)*a(j,k);  
		        endif
		    endfor
		endfor
	endfor

    for i=1:n
        for j=i+1:n
            a(i,j) = 0;
        endfor
    endfor            
endfunction

References
 Incomplete Cholesky factorization at CFD Online wiki
 . See Section 10.3.2.

Numerical linear algebra